Thorley may refer to:

Places
 Thorley, Hertfordshire, England
 Thorley, Isle of Wight, England

People with the surname Thorley
 Di Thorley, Australian politician
 Wilfrid Thorley, English poet
 Ollie Thorley, English rugby player

People with the given name Thorley
Thorley is a rare given name, usually male. People with that name include:

Real people
 Thorley Walters (1913-1991), English actor
 Thorley Smith (1873-1940), Britain's first Parliamentary candidate to stand on a platform of women's suffrage

Fictional characters
 Thorley "Thor" Callum, main female character in Raoul Walsh's 1947 film Pursued